Belmont Preparatory High School, or Belmont Prep is a small school located within the Theodore Roosevelt Educational Campus, across the street from Fordham University, in the Belmont section of the Bronx, New York City.

As of the 2014–15 school year, the school had an enrollment of 418 students and 30.0 classroom teachers (on an FTE basis), for a student–teacher ratio of 13.9:1. There were 323 students (77.3% of enrollment) eligible for free lunch and 33 (7.9% of students) eligible for reduced-cost lunch.

References

External links
 Page on NYC DOE website
 Listing on insideschools.org

Public high schools in the Bronx
Belmont, Bronx